The 2020 Six Nations Under 20s Championship was the 13th series of the Six Nations Under 20s Championship, the annual northern hemisphere rugby union championship. Ireland were the defending champions, having won the 2019 Championship with a Grand Slam.

The tournament was suspended with three games left to play due to the COVID-19 pandemic and cancelled in August with no winner announced.

Participants

Table

Table ranking rules
 Four match points are awarded for a win.
 Two match points are awarded for a draw.
 A bonus match point is awarded to a team that scores four or more tries in a match or loses a match by seven points or fewer. If a team scores four tries in a match and loses by seven points or fewer, they are awarded both bonus points.
 Three bonus match points are awarded to a team that wins all five of their matches (known as a Grand Slam). This ensures that a Grand Slam winning team always ranks over a team who won four matches in which they also were awarded four try bonus points and were also awarded two bonus points in the match that they lost.
 Tie-breakers
 If two or more teams are tied on match points, the team with the better points difference (points scored less points conceded) is ranked higher.
 If the above tie-breaker fails to separate tied teams, the team that scored the higher number of total tries in their matches is ranked higher.
 If two or more teams remain tied for first place at the end of the championship after applying the above tiebreakers, the title is shared between them.

Fixtures

Week 1

Week 2

Week 3

Week 4

 Due to the coronavirus pandemic in Italy, this match was postponed, then cancelled.

Week 5

 Due to the coronavirus pandemic in France, this match was postponed, then cancelled.

 Due to the coronavirus pandemic in Italy, this match was postponed, then cancelled.

See also
2020 Six Nations Championship
2020 Women's Six Nations Championship

References

External links
Under-20 Six Nations 

2020
2020 rugby union tournaments for national teams
2019–20 in English rugby union
2019–20 in French rugby union
2019–20 in Irish rugby union
2019–20 in Italian rugby union
2019–20 in Scottish rugby union
2019–20 in Welsh rugby union
Under 20
January 2020 sports events in Europe
January 2020 sports events in the United Kingdom
February 2020 sports events in Europe
February 2020 sports events in France
February 2020 sports events in Italy
February 2020 sports events in the United Kingdom
March 2020 sports events in Europe
March 2020 sports events in France
March 2020 sports events in Italy
March 2020 sports events in the United Kingdom
Six Nations Under 20s Championship